Itadava (Itadeva, Itadeba) was a Dacian town, in the territory of the fortress with unknown name near Burgaraca.

See also 
 Dacian davae
 List of ancient cities in Thrace and Dacia
 Dacia
 Roman Dacia

Notes

References

Ancient

Modern

Further reading 

Dacian towns